Oskar  Meder (1877 Georgenburg, Ostpreußen – 1944 Kiel)  was a German entomologist who specialised in Lepidoptera . 
He wrote Meder O, 1934
Mitteilungen über Kleinfalter der Nordmark. Internationale entomologische Zeitschrift 27: 489-493 which includes the first description of the micromoth Coleophora arctostaphyli.  His collection of Lepidoptera from Schleswig-Holstein is held by the Zoological Museum of the University of Kiel

References 
Groll, E. K. 2017: Biographies of the Entomologists of the World. – Online database, version 8, Senckenberg Deutsches Entomologisches Institut, Müncheberg – URL: sdei.senckenberg.de/biografies
Warnecke, A. 1948 Nachrichten über deutsche Lepidopterologen, Museen, Institute und Sammlungen. Nachr.bl. Ent. Sekt. naturw. Ver. Kärnten 3, S. 36-40, pp. 38
Hans Sachtleben (1961) Nachträge zu 'Walther Horn & Ilse Kahle: Über entomologische Sammlungen'. – Beiträge zur Entomologie = Contributions to Entomology – 11: 481 - 540.

German lepidopterists
1944 deaths
1877 births